The Wallace may refer to:-

Sir William Wallace, the Scottish resistance leader.
Who fought for freedom of Scottish people's against England.
The Actes and Deidis of the Illustre and Vallyeant Campioun Schir William Wallace, an epic poem about the life of William Wallace by the Scottish writer Blind Harry
The Wallace, a historical novel about the life of William Wallace by Nigel Tranter